Oliver is a city in Screven County, Georgia, United States. The population as of the 2000 census was 253.

Geography

Oliver is located at  (32.522176, -81.532458).

Demographics

As of the census of 2000, there were 253 people, 97 households, and 76 families residing in the city. The racial makeup of the city was 50.59% African American, 45.45% White,  0.40% Asian, 2.77% Pacific Islander, and 0.79% from two or more races. Hispanic or Latino of any race were 2.77% of the population.

There were 97 households, out of which 43.3% had children under the age of 18 living with them, 42.3% were married couples living together, 25.8% had a female householder with no husband present, and 21.6% were non-families. 20.6% of all households were made up of individuals, and 12.4% had someone living alone who was 65 years of age or older.  The average household size was 2.61 and the average family size was 2.91.

In the city, the population was spread out, with 31.6% under the age of 18, 8.7% from 18 to 24, 29.2% from 25 to 44, 16.6% from 45 to 64, and 13.8% who were 65 years of age or older.  The median age was 36 years. For every 100 females, there were 96.1 males.  For every 100 females age 18 and over, there were 80.2 males.

The median income for a household in the city was $25,893, and the median income for a family was $32,500. Males had a median income of $27,321 versus $17,031 for females. The per capita income for the city was $12,378.  About 25.0% of families and 30.8% of the population were below the poverty line, including 48.1% of those under the age of eighteen and 30.3% of those 65 or over.

References

Cities in Georgia (U.S. state)
Cities in Screven County, Georgia